Bang Phrom is a khwaeng (subdistrict) of Taling Chan district, Bangkok's Thonburi side.

History
It is named after Khlong Bang Phrom, a khlong (canal) currents through the northern part and a dividing line between its area with neighbouring Bang Ramat.

In the past, Bang Phrom used to be a rice planting area and there was a wide area extending to neighbouring subdistricts such as Bang Ramat. Local farmers therefore respect Phosop (goddess of rice) and there was a shrine dedicated to her which still exists today inside Wat Siri Watthanaram where confluence of three khlongs Bang Phrom, Lat Ta Niao, and Latmayom. Also in those days, they will have a ceremony to invite the Phosop statue procession to the various khlongs in Taling Chan at around 09.00 am. Then brought up to be enshrined in a local temple and have a complete celebration all night. Later the next day, therefore back by passing Khlong Bang Chueak Nang.

Her original statue is rumored to be gold. It has been stolen by three men from outside the area circa the late 1970s until today, this original statue is not found.

Most mill owners in this area are Chinese.

What is a pity that at present Bang Phrom do not have rice fields anymore. In which the last rice fields were dissolved around 1983.

In the year 1940, Bang Phrom consists of 20 mubans (villages).

It contained 15 administrative villages until the dissolution of administrative villages in the area of Bangkok.

Geography

Neighbouring subdistricts are (from the north clockwise): Bang Ramat and Khlong Chak Phra in its district, Khuha Sawan of Phasi Charoen district, Bang Chueak Nang in its district, and Thawi Watthana of Thawi Watthana district, respectively.

Like other areas of Taling Chan, Bang Phrom is filled with many ancient temples and agricultural areas.

Bang Phrom is an area that is easily accessible from Soi Charan Sanit Wong 35 in Bang Khun Si subdistrict, Bangkok Noi district and also consists of many roads.

The eponymous Khlong Bang Phrom is a main watercourse of the area. It started in the eastern side of the area, at the mouth of the course is the location of two temples that are paired together, Wat Ratchada Thisathan Ratchaworawihan (Wat Ngoen) and the opposite side Wat Kanchana Singhat (Wat Thong  – situated in the Khlong Chak Phra subdistrict), then current continuously as far as Thawi Watthana area.

Places
Wat Krachom Thong
Wat Kaeo
Wat Thep Phon
Wat Prasat
Wat Phleng (Klang Suan)
Wat Ratchada Thisathan Ratchaworawihan (Wat Ngoen)
Wat Siri Watthanaram
Wat Saphan
Wat Saphan Floating Market
Ratchaphruek Road
Phran Nok–Phutthamonthon Sai 4 Road
KIP Complex

References

Taling Chan district
Subdistricts of Bangkok